Senator Rhoades may refer to:

Elijah Rhoades (1791–1858), New York State Senate
James J. Rhoades (1941–2008), Pennsylvania State Senate

See also
Dean Rhoads (born 1935), Nevada State Senate
Senator Rhodes (disambiguation)